Alberto Miguel Quintana Moreno (born 5 October 2001) is a Spanish footballer who plays for Real Valladolid Promesas. Mainly a central defender, he can also play as a defensive midfielder.

Club career
Born in Villanueva del Trabuco, Málaga, Andalusia, Quintana joined Málaga CF's youth setup in 2011 at the age of ten. On 3 June 2019, he renewed his contract with the club until 2022, being subsequently promoted to the reserves in Tercera División.

Quintana made his senior debut on 25 August 2019, starting in a 4–0 home routing of Alhaurín de la Torre CF. He scored his first senior goal on 18 October of the following year, netting the game's only in a home success over Juventud de Torremolinos CF.

Quintana made his first team debut on 1 December 2020, coming on as a late substitute for Pablo Chavarría in a 2–0 away win against CF Fuenlabrada in the Segunda División championship. On 4 July 2022, he moved to another reserve team, Real Valladolid Promesas in Segunda Federación.

References

External links

2001 births
Living people
Sportspeople from the Province of Málaga
Spanish footballers
Footballers from Andalusia
Association football defenders
Segunda División players
Tercera División players
Tercera Federación players
Atlético Malagueño players
Málaga CF players
Real Valladolid Promesas players